Yong'anli station is a station on Line 1 of the Beijing Subway. Automatic platform gates were installed at this station on 18 July 2016, making Yong'anli Station the first station on Line 1 to install platform gates.

Nearby attractions
 Silk Street
 Taiwan Strait Tourism Association Beijing Office

Station layout 
The station has an underground island platform.

Exits 
There are three exits, lettered A, B, and C. Exit C is accessible.

Future plan
The station will be a transfer station between Line 1 and the under construction Line 17.

In long-term planning, the Line 18 and Line 20 will stop at this station as well.

References

External links
 

Beijing Subway stations in Chaoyang District
Railway stations in China opened in 1999